The Right Reverend Light Shinjiro Maekawa was consecrated as the Nippon Sei Ko Kai Bishop of Hokkaido in September 1941.

References

See also
 Anglican Church in Japan

20th-century Anglican priests
Japanese Anglican bishops
Anglican bishops of Hokkaido